Edidiong Ezekiel Enobong (born 8 August 2001) is a Nigerian international footballer who plays for Remo Stars F.C. as a Centre Forward.

Club career
Born in Akwa Ibom, Ezekiel spent his early career with Ibom Youths FC and Dakkada F.C.

Due to his prolific abilities, he was sent on loan to Dakkada F.C. after which he returned to Ibom Youth F.C. after his loan spell.

He was signed by Remo Stars F.C. in 2022 after he scored 10 goals with a host of assistance for Dakkada F.C.

He scored on his debut game for Remo Stars against Djeffa FC of Benin Republic.

International career
He made his international debut for Nigeria in a friendly against Costa Rica in 2022.

References

2001 births
Living people
Nigerian footballers
Dakkada F.C. players
Remo Stars F.C. players